Bira may refer to:

Places

Greece
Boura (Achaea) (alternatively spelled Bira or Bura), an ancient city of Achaea, Greece

India
Bira, North 24 Parganas, a census town in West Bengal, India
Bira railway station

Lebanon
Bireh, Akkar
Al-Bireh, Rashaya

Palestine
Al-Bireh
Ramallah and al-Bireh Governorate
Al-Bira, Baysan, Palestinian village, depopulated 1948

Russia
Bira, Russia, an urban-type settlement in the Jewish Autonomous Oblast, Russia
Bira (river), a tributary of the Amur in the Jewish Autonomous Oblast, Russia

Turkey
Bira, modern-day Birecik, a town in Şanlıurfa Province

Other uses 
Biotin ligase (BirA), an enzyme used in biotechnology
Bira (footballer) (born 1969), Brazilian association football player
Prince Bira (1914–1985), motor racing driver
Bira ceremony, a Shona spiritual ceremony where the ancestral spirits communicate with the living
Bira people, a tribe in eastern Democratic Republic of the Congo
Bira Circuit, a motorsport venue in Thailand
Emakumeen Euskal Bira,  a women's cycling race held in the Basque region of Spain
Ubirajara Penacho dos Reis (1934–2019), a Brazilian musician (Programa do Jô) known as Bira
Ubiratan Pereira Maciel (1944–2002), Brazilian basketball player known as Bira
Bira 91, a craft beer brand

See also
Birra (disambiguation)
Bhira (disambiguation)
Beer (disambiguation)b